In mathematics, particularly matrix theory, the n×n Lehmer matrix (named after Derrick Henry Lehmer) is the constant symmetric matrix defined by

Alternatively, this may be written as

Properties

As can be seen in the examples section, if A is an n×n Lehmer matrix and B is an m×m Lehmer matrix, then A is a submatrix of B whenever m>n. The values of elements diminish toward zero away from the diagonal, where all elements have value 1.

The inverse of a Lehmer matrix is a tridiagonal matrix, where the superdiagonal and subdiagonal have strictly negative entries. Consider again the n×n A and m×m B Lehmer matrices, where m>n. A rather peculiar property of their inverses is that A−1 is nearly a submatrix of B−1, except for the A−1n,n element, which is not equal to B−1n,n.

A Lehmer matrix of order n has trace n.

Examples
The 2×2, 3×3 and 4×4 Lehmer matrices and their inverses are shown below.

See also
 Derrick Henry Lehmer
 Hilbert matrix

References
 M. Newman and J. Todd, The evaluation of matrix inversion programs, Journal of the Society for Industrial and Applied Mathematics, Volume 6, 1958, pages 466-476.

Matrices